Harpesaurus ensicauda, the Nias nose-horned lizard, is a species of agamid lizard. It is endemic to Indonesia.

References

Harpesaurus
Reptiles of Indonesia
Reptiles described in 1913
Taxa named by Franz Werner